Stephen Kenna (born 8 October 1981) is a former Australian rules footballer who played with Carlton in the Australian Football League (AFL). After being delisted from Carlton, Kenna moved to South Adelaide in the South Australian National Football League (SANFL). He played 48 games for South Adelaide, coming second in the 2006 Magarey Medal and representing the SANFL twice, before returning to Melbourne midway through 2007. Once back in Melbourne, Kenna played for Box Hill in the Victorian Football League (VFL), whom he had played for before being drafted by Carlton. He won the club's best and fairest in 2008 and was captain of the club in 2009 and 2010. Kenna is now teaching at Yarra Valley Grammar School in Ringwood, Melbourne.

Sources

Holmesby, Russell & Main, Jim (2009). The Encyclopedia of AFL Footballers. 8th ed. Melbourne: Bas Publishing.

Carlton Football Club players
Living people
1981 births
Australian rules footballers from Queensland
Box Hill Football Club players
Morningside Australian Football Club players
Mount Gravatt Football Club players
South Adelaide Football Club players